Julian Ulbricht (born 6 June 1999) is a German professional footballer who plays as a forward for Phönix Lübeck.

Early life
Ulbricht played for the youth academy of FC St. Pauli. In 2015, he joined the youth setup of Hamburger SV.

Club career
In 2018, Ulbricht began playing at the senior level for Hamburger SV II in the fourth tier Regionalliga Nord. In January 2019, he went on trial with Schalke U23. In 2020, Canadian Premier League club Pacific FC had been interested in signing Ulbricht, however, due to the COVID-19 pandemic, the move was not able to be completed. After the 2019–20 season, he departed Hamburger SV. Following his release, he trained with fifth tier side Heeslinger SC.

On 7 October 2020, Ulbricht signed a contract for the 2021 season with an option for 2022 with Canadian Premier League side York United for the 2021 season. He was immediately sent on loan to German Regionalliga side Phönix Lübeck on a short-term deal through the end of 2020. He scored on his debut for Phönix Lübeck against FC St. Pauli II. Before joining York United in March 2021, he was forced quarantine in Turkey and then in Canada, due to travel restrictions emanating from the COVID-19 pandemic.

On 10 July 2021, Ulbricht made his debut as a substitute for York in a 3–0 loss to Pacific FC. On 21 August he scored his first goals for York, netting a brace in a Canadian Championship match against Master's FA. At the end of the season, York announced they had declined the option on Ulbricht's deal. However, on 10 February 2022, Ulbricht signed a new one-year deal with an optional extension with York, and was immediately loaned to FC Edmonton. He scored his first goal for Edmonton on April 30 against HFX Wanderers FC on a penalty kick.

On 11 July 2022, he returned to former club Phönix Lübeck.

Career statistics

References

External links

Julian Ulbricht at FuPa

1999 births
Living people
Association football forwards
German footballers
Footballers from Hamburg
German expatriate footballers
Expatriate soccer players in Canada
German expatriate sportspeople in Canada
FC St. Pauli players
Hamburger SV players
Hamburger SV II players
1. FC Phönix Lübeck players
York United FC players
FC Edmonton players
Regionalliga players
Canadian Premier League players